Chloropaschia godrica is a species of snout moth in the genus Chloropaschia. It is found in the Amazon region.

References

Moths described in 1934
Epipaschiinae